The Great River is a planned Amtrak intercity rail train that will operate in Illinois, Wisconsin and Minnesota between Chicago and St. Paul. It will be an extension of an existing Hiawatha Service train. This train will follow the routing of the Empire Builder for the entirety of its route and the Hiawatha Service from Chicago to Milwaukee.

Background

Originally, the Twin Cities-Milwaukee-Chicago (TCMC) Corridor was operated by the Chicago, Milwaukee, St. Paul & Pacific Railroad.  The Milwaukee Road ran numerous passenger trains from Chicago to St. Paul and beyond including the famous Twin Cities Hiawatha and Olympian Hiawatha. When Amtrak took over intercity passenger trains in 1971, only the Empire Builder continued serving the corridor. For a time, the North Coast Hiawatha and the North Star served this route as well.

, the Empire Builder continues to run daily, while the Hiawatha service runs seven additional round trips per day between Chicago and Milwaukee.

The TCMC project began in 2015 after the conclusion of a feasibility report by Amtrak.  Based on the favorable ridership and revenue projections MnDOT led a Phase 1 study in cooperation with WisDOT, IDOT, the Ramsey County Regional Railroad Authority and the FRA to analyze service alternatives, infrastructure upgrades and anticipated costs.  The Phase 2 study was led by WisDOT to complete the environmental review and prepare a Service Development Plan. Schedule delays from Seattle to St. Paul have been cited as part of the interest in having a reliable departure time from St. Paul.

Infrastructure upgrades for the project are required in La Crosse, La Crescent, Winona and St. Paul. The total capital cost is $53.3 million, which has been fully funded by federal grants, WisDOT and MnDOT.  The project is currently scheduled to begin construction in 2023 and begin operations with one train in 2023. The TCMC service is anticipated to be the first phase of additional Amtrak service across Wisconsin and Minnesota with eventual extensions to Madison, WI, Eau Claire, WI and Duluth, MN.

In a public meeting on December 1, 2022, an Amtrak representative expected the service to start by summer 2023 with the name Great River.

Operation

The Great River train will make 13 total stops from Chicago to St. Paul.  Westbound, the journey will take 7 hours and 11 minutes, while it will take 7 hours 27 minutes eastbound.  Each direction, the train will have a 5 minute long stop in Milwaukee.

The train will be not be a completely new service, but will rather extend an existing Hiawatha Service train from Milwaukee to St. Paul and back.  The trains that will be extended are numbers 333 and 340, with train 333 departing Chicago at 11:05am and train 340 arriving in Chicago at 7:14pm. An eventual re-route through Madison is in the long term plans for the Great River route. This change in routing would likely follow the Wisconsin & Southern Watertown Subdivision and Canadian Pacific's M&P Subdivision bypassing the Columbus station which is currently considered the Madison stop along the route. 

Ridership is projected to be 124,000 passengers per year in 2024.

An extension of the route to Target Field station in Minneapolis, and possibly St. Cloud is also being proposed.

Route and stops

References

Passenger rail transportation in Illinois
Passenger rail transportation in Wisconsin
Passenger rail transportation in Minnesota
Proposed railway lines in Illinois
Proposed railway lines in Minnesota
2023 in rail transport
Proposed Amtrak routes